Launched in 2016, the UK Public Health Rapid Support Team (UK-PHRST) is an innovative government-academic partnership funded with UK aid by the Department of Health and Social Care (DHSC) and co-led by the UK Health Security Agency (UKHSA) and the London School of Hygiene & Tropical Medicine (LSHTM), with a consortium of academic and implementing partners in the UK and internationally. The UK-PHRST has an integrated triple-remit of outbreak response, operational research and capacity strengthening, and plays an important role in global health security by working in partnership with low-and middle-income countries (LMICs) to:

•Rapidly investigate and respond to disease outbreaks at their source in LMICs eligible for UK Official Development Assistance, with the aim of stopping a public health threat from becoming a broader health emergency.

•Conduct research to generate an evidence base for best practice in epidemic preparedness and response.

•Strengthen capacity for improved national response to disease outbreaks in LMICs. 

Both organisations contribute to deliver the UK-PHRST triple mandate across outbreak response, operational research, and capacity strengthening, with LSHTM leading the research programme and the UKHSA leading outbreak response. Infectious diseases can spread rapidly and do not respect borders. Responding to infectious diseases at their source is the most effective way to protect the UK’s population from these types of public health threats. The UK-PHRST is a globally engaged health protection team of epidemiologists, public health microbiologists, social scientists, clinical researchers, and academics. The team works effectively with other countries and international health partners to help stop infectious diseases from spreading.

References

External links
 

London School of Hygiene & Tropical Medicine
Organizations with year of establishment missing